Dhiman Roy is an Indian Politician from the state of West Bengal. He is a two term member of the West Bengal Legislative Assembly.

Constituency
He represents the Ashoknagar (Vidhan Sabha constituency).

Political Party  
He is from the All India Trinamool Congress.

References 

West Bengal MLAs 2011–2016
West Bengal MLAs 2016–2021
Living people
Trinamool Congress politicians from West Bengal
Year of birth missing (living people)